Charles Arnette Towne (November 21, 1858October 22, 1928) was an American politician.

Biography
Born near Pontiac, Michigan, he graduated from the University of Michigan and served in the United States House of Representatives from Minnesota as a Republican in the 54th congress and from New York as a Democrat in the 59th congress.

Towne also served in the United States Senate in the 56th congress, from Minnesota as a Democrat following the death of Cushman K. Davis.
Towne was appointed to the Senate to fill the vacancy, and served from December 5, 1900, to January 28, 1901, when the elected replacement took office.

Towne represented Minnesota in the House from March 4, 1895, to March 3, 1897. He ran for reelection in 1896 as an Independent and lost.  In 1900, he declined the nomination for Vice President on the People's Party ticket.

He served again in the United States House of Representatives for the state of New York from March 4, 1905, to March 3, 1907. In December 1915, he and Benjamin F. Spellman represented L. Lawrence Weber as the appellant before the Supreme Court of the United States in the Weber v. Freed case concerning boxing match film distribution. The appeal was denied.

He died on October 22, 1928.

External links 

 
 OurCampaigns biography
 Justia.com "Weber v. Freed"

1858 births
1928 deaths
19th-century American politicians
20th-century American politicians
Politicians from Pontiac, Michigan
Candidates in the 1904 United States presidential election
University of Michigan alumni
Minnesota Democrats
Democratic Party United States senators from Minnesota
Republican Party members of the United States House of Representatives from Minnesota
Democratic Party members of the United States House of Representatives from New York (state)
Minnesota Independents